The 2019 Baylor Bears football team represented Baylor University in the 2019 NCAA Division I FBS football season. The Bears played their home games at the McLane Stadium in Waco, Texas, and competed in the Big 12 Conference. They were led by Matt Rhule in his third and final season as the program's head coach.

Baylor, only two years removed from a 1–11 season in 2017, began the year unranked and projected to finish in sixth in the Big 12 Conference. The Bears won their first nine games of the season and climbed to 13th in the College Football Playoff rankings, but did not play a ranked team in that span. The team then hosted then-No. 10 Oklahoma, but Baylor squandered a 25-point lead and lost 34–31. Baylor finished out the regular season with an 11–1 record, 8–1 in Big 12 play to finish tied atop the conference standings, earning them a spot in the Big 12 Championship Game, the school's first appearance in the game, to play a rematch against Oklahoma. There, the Bears lost to the Sooners again, this time in overtime, 30–23. Baylor received an invitation to the Sugar Bowl to play SEC runner-up Georgia, where they lost 26–14, to end the season at 11–3 and ranked 13th in the final AP Poll.

Baylor's defense was led by defensive tackle James Lynch, who was a consensus All-American and the Big 12 Defensive Player of the Year. He led the conference with 13.5 sacks on the season. He was joined on the first-team all-conference by defensive tackle Bravvion Roy. Offensively, the Bears were led by 3,000-yard passer Charlie Brewer, and 1,000-yard receiver Denzel Mims. Head coach Matt Rhule was named Big 12 Coach of the Year, and, after the completion of the season, he departed to take the head coaching job with the Carolina Panthers.

Previous season
The Bears finished the 2018 season 7–6, 4–5 in Big 12 play to finish in a two-way tie for fifth place. The Bears were eligible for post-season play in which they defeated the Vanderbilt Commodores of the SEC 45-38 in the 13th edition of the Texas Bowl at NRG Stadium in Houston. This was Baylor's first winning season since 2016.

Preseason

Recruiting class
References:

|}

Award watch lists
Listed in the order that they were released

References:

Big 12 media poll
The 2019 Big 12 media days were held July 15–16, 2019 in Frisco, Texas. In the Big 12 preseason media poll, Baylor was predicted to finish in sixth in the standings.

Preseason All-Big 12 teams

Defensive

James Lynch – JR, Defensive Lineman
Clay Johnston – SR, Linebacker

References:

Roster

Schedule
Baylor announced its 2019 football schedule on October 18, 2018. The 2019 schedule consists of 7 home and 5 away games in the regular season.

Schedule Source:

Game summaries

Stephen F. Austin

Baylor opened up the 2019 season by beating FCS Stephen F. Austin 56-17 in Waco. Trestan Ebner had three first half touchdowns for the Bears

UTSA

at Rice

Iowa State

at Kansas State

Baylor's defense proved formidable and produced two turnovers, while their offense completed a blanced run game.  Baylor remained undefeated with the 31-12 win over Kansas State.

Texas Tech

For the team's homecoming game, Baylor replaced their traditional interlocking 'BU' on their green helmet with the 'Sailor Bear' logo originally created by Arthur Evans for the second straight year.

Texas Tech traveled to Waco to play Baylor, the two teams had played one another at AT&T Stadium in Arlington, TX nearly every year from 2009-2018. The 2010 game was played at the Cotton Bowl in Dallas, TX, the only game in this stretch that was not played at AT&T Stadium.

The first half of the game was a defensive battle between the two teams. Texas Tech scored only 6 points in the half with two field goals from Trey Wolff while Baylor only scored 3 with a 37-yard field goal from John Mayers. The Red Raiders had 182 yards of offense in the first half while the Bears had 117. Baylor scored the first touchdown of the game for either team on its first drive of the half with a 4-yard run from Charlie Brewer. After trailing for most of the half, the Red Raiders scored a touchdown with 1:37 left in regulation to take a 20–17 lead. The Bears marched down field with Mayers making a 19-yard field goal as time expired to tie the game. Baylor started overtime on offense with Texas Tech on defense. During the drive, center Jake Fruhmorgen appeared to have fumbled the ball on a snap with the ball being recovered by Jaylon Hutchings for the Red Raiders and the play was blown dead quickly. The fumble was overturned as Baylor was penalized for an illegal snap penalty. The call was heavily criticized and the following day Texas Tech athletic director Kirby Hocutt announced that the Big 12 had told him that the penalty was the wrong call and that Texas Tech should have gained possession. Hocutt was later fined by the conference for making the announcement in violation of league policy.

After winning in 2 overtime periods by a score of 33-30, Baylor moved up 4 spots in the AP poll from #22 to #18.

at Oklahoma State

West Virginia

at TCU

Heading into Week 11 of the college football season, Baylor is on top of the Big 12 conference standings with an undefeated 8-0 record.  Recent victories over West Virginia and Texas Tech were close and TCU is looking to win a few more games to become eligible for a bowl game.  Both teams have been able to score and the game is listed as one of the most "compelling matchups" for the week by MSN Sports.

Oklahoma

Texas

at Kansas

vs. Oklahoma (Big 12 Championship Game)

vs. Georgia (2020 Sugar Bowl)

Rankings

Postseason

All-Big 12 Conference Football Team

Offense

1st team
Denzel Mims - SR, Wide Receiver

2nd team
Koby Bullard – JR, Fullback
Sam Tecklenburg – SR, Offensive Lineman

Defensive

1st team
James Lynch – JR, Defensive Lineman
Bravvion Roy – SR, Defensive Lineman

2nd team
Terrel Bernard – SO, Linebacker
Clay Johnston – SR, Linebacker
Grayland Arnold – JR, Defensive Back
Chris Miller – SR, Defensive Back

Honorable Mention
Charlie Brewer – JR, Quarterback
JaMycal Hasty – SR, Running Back
Jameson Houston – SR, Defensive Back
James Lockhart – SR, Defensive Lineman
Blake Lynch – SR, Linebacker
Xavier Newman-Johnson – JR , Offensive Lineman
Tyquan Thornton – SO, Wide Receiver

References:

Postseason Conference Accolades

Players drafted into the NFL

References

Baylor
Baylor Bears football seasons
Baylor Bears football